Roystonea borinquena, commonly called the Puerto Rico royal palm, (Spanish: palma real puertorriqueña) is a species of palm which is native to Hispaniola (in both the Dominican Republic and Haiti), Puerto Rico and the Virgin Islands.

Description
The  inflorescences bear creamy yellow male and female flowers; the anthers of the male flowers are bright purple. The greenish-yellow immature fruit turn brownish-purple as they ripen.

Taxonomy
Roystonea is placed in the subfamily Arecoideae and the tribe Roystoneae.  The placement of Roystonea within the Arecoideae is uncertain; a 2006 phylogeny based on plastid DNA failed to resolve the position of the genus within the Arecoideae.  As of 2008, there appeared to be no molecular phylogenetic studies of Roystonea and the relationship between R. borinquena and the rest of the genus is uncertain.

The species was first described by American botanist Orator F. Cook in 1901.  For most of the 19th century, only two species of royal palms were generally recognized: Greater Antillean royal palms were considered Oreodoxa regia (now Roystonea regia), while Lesser Antillean ones were considered O. oleracea (R. oleracea).  Due to problems with the way that the genus Oreodoxa had been applied by taxonomists, Cook proposed that the name Roystonea (in honor of American general Roy Stone) in 1900 be applied to the royal palms.  The following year Cook described Roystonea borinquena.

Common names
Roystonea borinquena is known as the "mountain-cabbage", "Puerto Rico royal palm" or simply "royal palm" in English, palmiste in Haiti, palma real puertorriqueña, manacla, palma caruta, palma de cerdos, palma de grana, palma de yagua, palma real, yagua and other names in Puerto Rico and the Dominican Republic.

Reproduction and growth
Young Roystonea borinquena trees may begin flowering when they are about seven years old, and they flower throughout the year. The flowers of Roystonea borinquena produce nectar and are visited by honey bees; and are thought to be insect-pollinated. Flowering individuals bear an average of 3.2 inflorescences per tree, and produce 6–12,000 fruit per inflorescence. Seeds germinate after 50–100 days.

Distribution
Roystonea borinquena is native to Hispaniola, Puerto Rico (including Vieques) and St. Croix, St. John and Tortola in the Virgin Islands.

Ecology
Roystonea borinquena fruit are a fat-rich food source for birds.  White-crowned pigeons (Patagioenas leucocephala) have been reported to disperse the seeds of the species. The Critically Endangered Ridgway's hawk (Buteo ridgwayi), endemic to Hispaniola, favours R. borinquena when nesting.

Uses
Royal palms are popular ornamental plants due to their striking appearance; Roystonea borinquena is extensively planted as an ornamental in Puerto Rico.  Its tolerance of air pollution, its ability to grow in a variety of soil types, and the fact that it roots do not damage sidewalks, increase its utility for landscaping and street planting.  Its timber is occasionally used for construction but is susceptible to termite attack.  Leaves are used as thatch and the leaf sheaths can be laid flat and used to make the sides of buildings.  The fruit are also fed to pigs and other livestock.

References

borinquena
Trees of the Caribbean
Taxobox binomials not recognized by IUCN